Otčenášek, female Otčenášková is a Czech surname.  is Lord's Prayer. Notable people with the surname include:

Karel Otčenášek (1918–2011), Czech prelate of the Roman Catholic Church
Jan Otčenášek (1924–1979), Czech novelist

Czech-language surnames